"Princess of Egypt" is a song by Swedish musician Bo Martin Erik Erikson, known under the pseudonym of E-Type. It was released as the third single from his third album, Last Man Standing (1998), and is a tribute to his longtime backing vocalist Nana Hedin. Produced by David Kreuger and Per Magnusson, it features vocals by Jeanette Soderholm, and peaked at number nine on the Swedish singles chart with 11 weeks on the chart. It also charted in Finland and Romania. The maxi-single included the music video of his previous hit-single, "Here I Go Again".

Music video
A music video was produced to promote the single and was later published on E-Type's official YouTube channel in April 2016. It has amassed more than 2 million views as of September 2021.

Track listing
 CD single, Germany
"Princess of Egypt" (Radio Version) – 3:39
"Princess of Egypt" (Extended Version) – 5:08

 CD maxi, Sweden
"Princess of Egypt" (Radio Version) – 3:39
"Princess of Egypt" (Pierre J's Q-Type Remix) – 7:00
"Princess of Egypt" (Pinocchio Remix) – 5:43
"Princess of Egypt" (Extended Version) – 5:08
"Here I Go Again" (Video) – 4:39

Charts

Weekly charts

Year-end charts

References

 

E-Type (musician) songs
Stockholm Records singles
1999 singles
1999 songs
Reggae fusion songs
English-language Swedish songs